The 2019–20 Liga IV Dolj, commonly known as Liga IV Mass for sponsorship reasons, was the 52nd season of the Liga IV Dolj, the fourth tier of the Romanian football league system. The season began on 24 August 2019 and was scheduled to end in June 2020, but was suspended in March because of the COVID-19 pandemic in Romania. 

The season was ended officially on 24 July 2020 after AJF Dolj (County Football Association) concluding that the teams could not meet the medical conditions for matches at this level. AJF Dolj offered the first five ranked, respectively Unirea Tricolor Dăbuleni, Jiul Podari, Cârcea, Metropolitan Ișalnița and Danubius Bechet, the opportunity to prove that they meet the conditions to end the season, through a possible play-off. Only the first, respectively Unirea Tricolor Dăbuleni, declared itself willing to comply with the new rigors.

Team changes

To Liga IV Dolj
Relegated from Liga III
 —

Promoted from Liga V Dolj
 Progresul Cerăt
 Tineretul Poiana Mare
 Viitorul Măceșu de Sus

From Liga IV Dolj
Promoted to Liga III
 Tractorul Cetate

Relegated to Liga V Dolj
 Unirea Vela

Other changes
 Vânătorul Desa was renamed as ACS Desa
 Tractorul Cetate II was enrolled in Liga IV on demand.
 Flacăra Moțăței was spared from relegation.

League table

Promotion play-off

Champions of Liga IV – Dolj County face champions of Liga IV – Argeș County and Liga IV – Dâmbovița County.

Region 5 (South–West)

Group A

See also

Main Leagues
 2019–20 Liga I
 2019–20 Liga II
 2019–20 Liga III
 2019–20 Liga IV

County Leagues (Liga IV series)

 2019–20 Liga IV Alba
 2019–20 Liga IV Arad
 2019–20 Liga IV Argeș
 2019–20 Liga IV Bacău
 2019–20 Liga IV Bihor
 2019–20 Liga IV Bistrița-Năsăud
 2019–20 Liga IV Botoșani
 2019–20 Liga IV Brăila
 2019–20 Liga IV Brașov
 2019–20 Liga IV Bucharest
 2019–20 Liga IV Buzău
 2019–20 Liga IV Călărași
 2019–20 Liga IV Caraș-Severin
 2019–20 Liga IV Cluj
 2019–20 Liga IV Constanța
 2019–20 Liga IV Covasna
 2019–20 Liga IV Dâmbovița
 2019–20 Liga IV Galați 
 2019–20 Liga IV Giurgiu
 2019–20 Liga IV Gorj
 2019–20 Liga IV Harghita
 2019–20 Liga IV Hunedoara
 2019–20 Liga IV Ialomița
 2019–20 Liga IV Iași
 2019–20 Liga IV Ilfov
 2019–20 Liga IV Maramureș
 2019–20 Liga IV Mehedinți
 2019–20 Liga IV Mureș
 2019–20 Liga IV Neamț
 2019–20 Liga IV Olt
 2019–20 Liga IV Prahova
 2019–20 Liga IV Sălaj
 2019–20 Liga IV Satu Mare
 2019–20 Liga IV Sibiu
 2019–20 Liga IV Suceava
 2019–20 Liga IV Teleorman
 2019–20 Liga IV Timiș
 2019–20 Liga IV Tulcea
 2019–20 Liga IV Vâlcea
 2019–20 Liga IV Vaslui
 2019–20 Liga IV Vrancea

References

External links
 Official website 

Liga IV seasons
Sport in Dolj County